Abul Wafa Sanaullah Amritsari (12 June 1868 – 15 March 1948) was a British Indian, later Pakistani, Muslim scholar and a leading figure within the Ahl-e-Hadith movement who was active in the Punjab city of Amritsar. He was an alumnus of Mazahir Uloom and the Darul Uloom Deoband. He was a major antagonist of Mirza Ghulam Ahmad and the early Qadiyyani movement. He served as the general secretary of the All India Jamiat-i- Ahl-i-Hadith from 1906 to 1947 and was the editor of the Ahl-e-Hadees, a weekly magazine.

Biography
Sanaullah Amritsari's ancestors belonged to Doru Shahabad, a town in the Anantnag district of Jammu and Kashmir]]. His father settled permanently in Amritsar, where he was born in 1868. He was schooled at Madrasa Ta'īd al-Islām in Amritsar, from where he moved to Wazirabad to study hadith with Abdul Mannan Wazirabadi. He then studied with Syed Nazir Hussain in Delhi. He joined Mazahir Uloom for higher education and thereafter completed his studies at Darul Uloom Deoband, where his teachers included Mahmud Hasan Deobandi.. He had joined the Deoband seminary in 1890 to study logic, philosophy and Fiqh. He subsequently attended the lectures of Aḥmad Ḥasan at the Madrasa Faiz-e-Aam, in Kanpur.

Amritsari started his career with teaching at his alma mater Madrasa Ta'īd al-Islām in Amritsar, in 1893, and taught the books of dars-e-nizami. He then became the director of education at the Madrasa Islamiyyah in Maler Kotla.  He subsequently stepped into polemics and began debating the proponents of Arya Samaj and specially Ahmadism. He established Ahl-e-Hadith Press in 1903 and published a weekly journal Ahl-e-Hadith which continued for about 44 years. He was a leading figure of the Ahl-e-Hadith movement and served as the general secretary of All India Jamiat-i- Ahl-Hadith from 1906 to 1947. He co-founded the Jamiat Ulama-e-Hind and had a rank of major general in Junud-e-Rabbania. He was president of Anjuman Ahl-e-Hadith Punjab. He was given the title Sher-e-Punjab for his services to Islam in Punjab. 

Amritsari migrated to Gujranwala, Pakistan after Partition of India in 1947 and died on 15 March 1948 in Sargodha.

Literary works
Amritsari wrote pamphlets and books mostly in the refutation of Mirza Ghulam Ahmad. Syed Mehboob Rizwi has mentioned Tafsir al-Quran be-Kalam al-Rahman, Tafsir-e-Sanai and Taqabul-e-Salasa as his important works. 

When Rangila Rasul was written on Islamic prophet Muhammad, Sanaullah Amritsari wrote Muqaddas Rasool as a reply to that book.

Legacy
  Faz̤lurraḥmān bin Muḥammad wrote Hazrat Maulana Sanaullah Amritsari.
 Abdul Majid Sohdri wrote Seerat Sanai.

See also

 Muhammad Hussain Batalvi
 Muhammad Sulaiman Salman Mansoorpuri
 Abdullah Ropari
 Muhammad Ibrahim Mir Sialkoti

References

Citations

Bibliography

External links
Tafsir Sanai By Sanaullah Amritsari

1868 births
1948 deaths
Pakistani Salafis
Atharis
Pakistani Sunni Muslim scholars of Islam
Quranic exegesis scholars
Critics of Ahmadiyya
Pakistani people of Kashmiri descent
Darul Uloom Deoband alumni
Students of Mahmud Hasan Deobandi
Founders of Jamiat Ulama-e-Hind
Ahl-i Hadith people
Mazahir Uloom alumni